Cumberland College may refer to:

Cumberland College of Health Sciences, Sydney, now University of Sydney School of Health Sciences
Cumberland College, Otago, a residential college for the University of Otago, in Dunedin, New Zealand
Cumberland College (Princeton, Kentucky), a defunct institution
Cumberland College (Saskatchewan)
Cumberland County College in Vineland, New Jersey
Cumberland School of Law in Birmingham, Alabama; formerly in Tennessee
Cumberland University in Lebanon, Tennessee; formerly named Cumberland College
University of Nashville, formerly named Cumberland College
University of the Cumberlands in Williamsburg, Kentucky; formerly named Cumberland College
University of the Ozarks, formerly named Arkansas Cumberland College